Aptostichus is a genus of North American mygalomorph spiders in the family Euctenizidae, and was first described by Eugène Simon in 1891. They are found predominantly in southern California, United States.

Behavior
Members of the North American genus, Aptostichus, assemble tunnels with side chambers, but they do not close these chambers with additional trapdoors.

Species

 it contains forty-one species in the United States and Mexico:
Aptostichus aguacaliente Bond, 2012 – USA
Aptostichus angelinajolieae Bond, 2008 – USA
Aptostichus anzaborrego Bond, 2012 – USA
Aptostichus asmodaeus Bond, 2012 – USA
Aptostichus atomarius Simon, 1891 (type) – USA
Aptostichus barackobamai Bond, 2012 – USA
Aptostichus bonoi Bond, 2012 – USA
Aptostichus cabrillo Bond, 2012 – USA, Mexico
Aptostichus cahuilla Bond, 2012 – USA
Aptostichus cajalco Bond, 2012 – USA
Aptostichus chavezi Bond, 2012 – USA
Aptostichus chemehuevi Bond, 2012 – USA
Aptostichus chiricahua Bond, 2012 – USA
Aptostichus dantrippi Bond, 2012 – USA
Aptostichus derhamgiulianii Bond, 2012 – USA
Aptostichus dorothealangeae Bond, 2012 – USA
Aptostichus edwardabbeyi Bond, 2012 – USA
Aptostichus elisabethae Bond, 2012 – USA
Aptostichus fisheri Bond, 2012 – USA
Aptostichus fornax Bond, 2012 – USA
Aptostichus hedinorum Bond, 2012 – USA
Aptostichus hesperus (Chamberlin, 1919) – USA
Aptostichus huntington Bond, 2012 – USA
Aptostichus icenoglei Bond, 2012 – USA, Mexico
Aptostichus isabella Bond, 2012 – USA
Aptostichus killerdana Bond, 2012 – USA
Aptostichus lucerne Bond, 2012 – USA
Aptostichus mikeradtkei Bond, 2012 – USA
Aptostichus miwok Bond, 2008 – USA
Aptostichus muiri Bond, 2012 – USA
Aptostichus nateevansi Bond, 2012 – USA
Aptostichus pennjillettei Bond, 2012 – USA
Aptostichus sabinae Valdez-Mondragón & Cortez-Roldán, 2016 – Mexico
Aptostichus sarlacc Bond, 2012 – USA
Aptostichus satleri Bond, 2012 – USA
Aptostichus serrano Bond, 2012 – USA
Aptostichus sierra Bond, 2012 – USA
Aptostichus simus Chamberlin, 1917 – USA, Mexico
Aptostichus sinnombre Bond, 2012 – USA
Aptostichus stanfordianus Smith, 1908 – USA
Aptostichus stephencolberti Bond, 2008 – USA

See also
Myrmekiaphila

References

Euctenizidae
Fauna of California
Mygalomorphae genera
Spiders of North America
Taxa named by Eugène Simon